The V-2 missile launch site, Blizna was the site of a World War II German V-2 missile firing range. Today there is a small museum located in the Park Historyczny Blizna (Historical Park) in Blizna, Poland. After the RAF strategic bombing of the V-2 rocket launch site in Peenemünde, Germany, in August 1943, some of the test and launch facilities were relocated to Blizna in November 1943. The first of 139 V-2 launches was carried out from the Blizna launch site on 5 November 1943.

History 
After the air raid on Peenemünde on 17 August 1943, German strategic command decided to divide the work on the V-2 rocket among three independently operating centres. Assembly plants were transferred to underground factories that had been built in a massive hollow cave complex in the Harz mountains in Germany. The research, development, and design (codenamed "Project Cement") were handled by secret offices in Ebensee, near the banks of Lake Traunsee in Austria. The main rocket testing, training, and launch site was transferred to Blizna in southeast Poland, outside of the range of Allied bombers. An SS military base near Blizna was set up on 5 November 1943, from which 139 A4 (also known as V-2) rockets were launched for experimental purposes and for training. The site was operational until early July 1944. Test launches also continued at Peenemünde until 21 February 1945.

Before construction began in Blizna, there was nothing there but uncleared forest. The Nazis used slave labour from the nearby SS Truppenübungsplatz Heidelager concentration camp in Pustków to build new infrastructure, starting with concrete roads, then a narrow-gauge railway line linking to the station at Kochanówka village. They built barracks, bunkers, buildings and all the specialised equipment needed for the operation and firing of rockets. In addition, efforts were made to disguise the site as much as possible. They did this by building an artificial village; cottages and barns were made of plywood, lines were hung with clothes and bed-sheets, and imitation people and animals were created using gypsum plaster.

The site was considered to be of such high strategic importance that it attracted personal visits from many of the Nazi régime's most elite officers; Heinrich Himmler and SS-Obergruppenführers Hans Kammler and Gottlob Berger visited in September 1943, and Adolf Hitler visited in the spring of 1944. The commander of the site was Major-General Dr Walter Dornberger, leader of Nazi Germany's V-2 rocket program. Wernher von Braun, creator of the V-2, the central figure in Germany's pre-war rocket development program, and post-war director of NASA's Marshall Space Flight Center, worked at the Blizna test site and personally visited the test missile impact areas to troubleshoot any problems discovered during trials.

British Intelligence were very keen to obtain information about the new V-2 missile site. The first reports came in October 1943 from the Polish underground Home Army Intelligence HQ in Warsaw, stating that a number of villages around Dębica were being forcibly evacuated. This area was already known for its SStraining centre SS-Truppenübungsplatz Heidelager. Further reports brought information about a new railway line being constructed in the same vicinity, leading to Blizna. A report made on 14 February 1944 gave information about a sighting of a rocket " long and [with] a weight of seven tons". On 22 February the report was of a projectile " long, [with] a diameter [of]  and a weight of twelve tons". These missiles were being fired 24 hours a day. The codebreakers at Bletchley Park in England also managed to decrypt vital information from German communications. These made mention of " (experimental staff)  Siegfried" and of "SS-Truppenübungsplatz Heidelager". Many more communications were intercepted and decrypted, which together with information from the Polish, helped British Intelligence build up a good picture of what was going on.

The missile testing ground at Blizna was quickly located by the Polish resistance movement, the Armia Krajowa, thanks to reports from local farmers. The site was constantly under observation by Armia Krajowa and the Polish Peasant Battalions. Due to Blizna's perceived strategic importance, Armia Krajowa (AK) had many field agents operating covertly in the area; these included AK Kolbuszowa (code name: "Kefir"), AK Dębica (code name: "Deser") and AK Mielec (code name: "Mleko"). These field agents even managed to obtain pieces of the fired rockets, by arriving on the scene before German patrols. These fragments were then smuggled by AK agents to secret labs in Warsaw, where the rocket parts were analysed by specialist teams, headed by Professors Marceli Struszyński and Janusz Groszkowski, and glider constructor Antoni Kocjan. Vital information about the rocket propellant was discovered when numerous reports came in of a strong smell of alcohol at the crash sites. AK agent Aleksander Rusin (code name: "Rusal") was one of these witnesses. A V-2 missile crash-landed near to his observation location near Mielec. Rusin ran up to the crash site and found an intact working motor, which he managed to measure and sketch shortly before it exploded. 

In early March 1944 British Intelligence Headquarters received a report of an Armia Krajowa agent (code name: "Makara") who had covertly surveyed the Blizna railway line and observed a freight car heavily guarded by SS troops containing "an object which, though covered by a tarpaulin, bore every resemblance to a monstrous torpedo". Subsequently, a plan was formed to make an attempt to capture a whole unexploded V-2 rocket and transport it to Britain. The plan was to stop the train in the forested area between Brzeskie and Tarnów.
Despite meticulous planning by Armia Krajowa, the security on the German supply trains had been increased dramatically and the plan had to be called off at the last minute, as it had become unfeasible. Around 20 May 1944, a relatively undamaged V-2 rocket fell on the swampy bank of the Bug River near the village of Sarnaki, south of Siemiatycze, and local Poles managed to hide it before Germans arrived. The rocket was then dismantled and smuggled across Poland. During the night of 25–26 July 1944, the Polish resistance (Home Army and V1 and V2) secretly transported parts of the rocket out of Poland in Operation Most III (BridgeIII or WildhornIII), for analysis by British Intelligence. The missile fragments were picked up by an American C-47 Dakota aeroplane from an AK agent (code name: "Motyl") in an abandoned airfield between the villages of Jadowniki Mokre and Wał-Ruda, near Żabno, at the junction of the Dunajec and Wisła rivers, Poland.

On 13 July 1944, the British Prime Minister Winston Churchill wrote a letter to Joseph Stalin, informing him about the German V-2 missiles being tested in Blizna. He also asked Stalin to allow British experts to visit Dębica to examine the missile base. Stalin granted Churchill's requests; however, at the same time he instructed his army intelligence and USSR State Defense Committee People's Commissar for Aviation Industry, Alexei Shakhurin, to get ready for the examination of the German missiles. Shakhurin was ordered to have his weaponry experts in Dębica long before the British arrived. In late July 1944, the advance of the Red Army forced the Germans to evacuate the base at Blizna, and launch activities were moved to the Tuchola Forest. The Red Army reached Blizna on 6 August 1944, about ten days after the Germans had moved out. Many of the first remnants of V-2 missiles were recovered by troops of the 60th Army commanded by General Pavel Alekseyevich Kurochkin. British intelligence agents were eventually granted access to the launch site in September 1944. Their mission was to collect as many remaining rocket parts and as much intel on the site as they could. By then, the Red Army had already cleared out most of what the Germans had left and had shipped it to the Soviet Union, following Stalin's instructions. However, the British did manage to fill several crates with some useful V-2 rocket parts, which were then transported to England with the full co-operation of the Soviets. When the crates were opened in London, they did not have the expected contents; instead, they contained old rusty truck and tank parts, which had probably been substituted by Soviet agents.

See also 
 List of Blizna V-2 test launches
 Rocket launch site
 SS-Truppenübungsplatz Heidelager
 Operation Osoaviakhim

References

Footnotes

Notes

Bibliography

Further reading 
 Dungan, Tracy D. (2005). V-2: A Combat History of the First Ballistic Missile. Westholme Publishing. .
 
 Huzel, Dieter K. (c. 1965). Peenemünde to Canaveral. Prentice Hall Inc.
 Piszkiewicz, Dennis (1995). The Nazi Rocketeers: Dreams of Space and Crimes of War. Westport, Conn.: Praeger. .

Sources 
 First Launch: 1943-11-05. Last Launch: 1944-07-24. Number: 277 . Location: Blizna, Poland. Longitude: 21.6162 deg. Latitude: 50.1819 deg.
 Diver – a secret British Defence Instruction specified the code name: "Enemy Flying Bombs will be referred to or known as 'Diver' aircraft or pilotless planes" to alert defences of an imminent attack (often called Operation Diver, particularly post-war, without citation).

 
 
 
 The initial version of this article is based upon the history section of article Blizna of the English edition of Wikipedia.
 :

Gallery

External links 

 Park Historyczny Blizna live cam
 BLIZNA – Poligon rakietowy V-1 V-2  Video on YouTube
 Instagram photos
 Archived Truppenubungsplatz Heidelager. German test range for production V-2 missiles.
 Zdjęcia Parku Historycznego BLIZNA

Blizna
World War II sites in Poland
World War II sites of Nazi Germany
World War II museums in Poland
Military operations involving the Home Army
Ropczyce-Sędziszów County
Weaponry articles needing attention to structure